Marian Kosiński (4 December 1945 – 21 April 2021) was a Polish professional football player (central defender) and coach. 

Before he went on to coach them, he won the title with Stal Mielec twice, and was listed in the Stal's all-time best XI.

References

External links
 

2021 deaths
1945 births
People from Tarnowskie Góry
Polish footballers
Association football defenders
Stal Mielec players
Polish football managers
Karpaty Krosno managers
Stal Mielec managers